Jolien Verschueren (7 May 1990 – 2 July 2021) was a Belgian cyclo-cross cyclist, who rode for UCI Cyclo-cross team . She represented her nation in the women's elite event at the 2016 UCI Cyclo-cross World Championships in Heusden-Zolder.

Verschueren combined her cycling career with working as a schoolteacher. She won the Koppenbergcross in 2015 and repeated this at the 2016 DVV Verzekeringen Trofee Koppenbergcross 2016, besting world champion Thalita de Jong. On 12 April 2018, it was announced that earlier that week Verschueren was operated on to remove a malignant brain tumor. Verschueren tried a comeback in 2019 and 2020 but her health did not allow for good results. Her last race was the 2020 edition of the Koppenbergcross. Verschueren died of brain cancer on 2 July 2021. In October 2021 the organisers of the Koppenbergcross announced that the women's edition of the race would be known as the Grand Prix Jolien Verschueren in her memory.

References

External links
 
 

1990 births
2021 deaths
Cyclo-cross cyclists
Belgian female cyclists
Deaths from brain tumor
Sportspeople from Kortrijk
Cyclists from West Flanders